Banér may refer to:

Gustaf Banér, member of the Privy Council of Sweden
Johan Banér, Swedish Field Marshal in the Thirty Years' War, son of Gustaf Banér
Per Gustafsson Banér, member of the Privy Council of Sweden, son of Gustaf Banér
Sigrid Banér, noblewoman and letter writer, daughter of Gustaf Banér
Sigrid Eskilsdotter (Banér) (died 1527), Swedish noblewoman

See also
 Baner, a suburb of Pune, India